The Prime Show is an Indonesian television prime time talk show hosted by Aprilia Putri that aired on iNews. On September 28, 2022, it aired its first episode, "Menerawang Manuver Politik, PKB Punya Hubungan Historis dengan PDIP"

This program ended on November 16, 2022, because Aiman joined MNC Group after he resign from Kompas TV.

References 

Indonesian television news shows
Indonesian-language television shows
2022 Indonesian television series debuts
2022 Indonesian television series endings
2020s Indonesian television series
INews original programming